Lascar may refer to:

Lascar, a sailor or militiaman from South Asia employed by the European nations from the 16th century until the beginning of the 20th century
Lascar (volcano), the most active volcano of the northern Chilean Andes
Lascăr, a Romanian surname and given name
Pantoporia, a genus of butterfly
Upper and Lower Lascar Row, a street in Hong Kong

See also
Laskar (disambiguation)
Lashkar (disambiguation)